Khanaf Cheh (also known as Khān Afjeh and Khanafjeh) is a village in Pir Bazar Rural District, in the Central District of Rasht County, Gilan Province, Iran. At the 2006 census, its population was 264, in 66 families.

References 

Populated places in Rasht County